Logan is a city in Cache County, Utah, United States. The 2020 census recorded the population was 52,778. Logan is the county seat of Cache County and the principal city of the Logan metropolitan area, which includes Cache County and Franklin County, Idaho. The Logan metropolitan area contained 125,442 people as of the 2010 census and was declared by Morgan Quitno in 2005 and 2007 to be the safest in the United States in those years. Logan also is the location of the main campus of Utah State University.

History
The town of Logan was founded in 1859 by settlers sent by Brigham Young to survey for the site of a fort near the banks of the Logan River. They named their new community "Logan" for Ephraim Logan, an early fur trapper in the area. Logan was incorporated on January 17, 1866. Brigham Young College was founded here on August 6, 1877 (and closed in 1926), and Utah State University – then called the Agricultural College of Utah – was founded in 1888.

Logan's growth reflects settlement and post-war booms along with other changes incidental to conditions in the West. Logan grew to about 20,000 in the mid-1960s, and according to Census estimates, exceeded 50,000 in 2015.

Geography and climate

The city lies near the eastern edge of Cache Valley on the western slopes of the Bear River Mountains. Mount Logan rises to an elevation of  immediately to the east, and south of Logan Canyon. The eastern portions of the city are constructed on top of shelf-like "benches", late Pleistocene sedimentary deposits created by the glacially fed Logan River feeding into the northern stretches of Lake Bonneville, building a "Gilbert-type" river delta over several thousand years. The Logan River later cut down through these sedimentary deposits following the draining of Lake Bonneville approximately 14,500 years ago. This created a low-lying area with very steep slopes that reach into the rest of town and to the Logan River bottomlands. To the west of Logan lie flatlands that contain both farmland and marshes. To the north and south of Logan are rapidly growing residential suburbs.

Logan has a humid continental climate (Köppen: Dfa/Dfb) with very warm though usually dry summers and cold winters with moderate snowfall. Precipitation tends to be heaviest in the spring months. Like other areas in northern Utah, during mid-winter, high-pressure systems often situate themselves over Cache Valley, leading to strong temperature inversions. These temperature inversions trap cold air and pollutants and allow thick smog to accumulate in the valley about three percent of the time. This reduces the air quality to unhealthy levels and can result in the worst air pollution levels in the U.S.

Layout
Logan's city grid originates from its Main and Center Street block, with Main Street running north and south, and Center east and west. Each block north, east, south, or west of the origin accumulates in increments of 100 (e.g., 100 North, 100 East), though some streets have non-numeric names. This street grid is typical of many towns and cities founded by Latter-day Saints in the Mormon Corridor. Most of Logan's commercial businesses are along Main Street, which spans the entire city.

Logan's downtown area is in the center of the city and is noted for its many historic buildings and landmarks. Among them are the Logan Tabernacle and Logan Utah Temple, which was constructed on the highest hill in the valley so as to be seen for miles in all directions. Both buildings are owned and operated by the Church of Jesus Christ of Latter-day Saints. Along Center Street, which intersects Logan's Historic District, are a number of stately houses on the National Register of Historic Places. The downtown area also houses retail and cultural outlets, as well as the municipal and county buildings and courthouses.

The eastern portion of Logan includes the Cliffside and Island neighborhoods, as well as the university district. Utah State University (USU), with its many educational, cultural, agricultural, and athletic programs, was established in 1888. The campus stands on the eastern side of the city, near to the mountains. USU is the city's largest employer, and has an enrollment of about 24,000 students in Logan. Logan Canyon begins in the foothills close to campus.

Logan's southern portion is a mixture of commercial and residential, and contains portions of the Logan River as well as the fairgrounds and aquatic center. The northern area of Logan serves partly as a retail district with numerous shops and restaurants, including the Cache Valley Mall. Logan has the region's largest and most comprehensive hospital, Logan Regional Hospital. The western portion of Logan is set aside as a center for light industry, especially along the area of 1000 West Street, and it also contains residential communities.

Demographics

People
During the 2020 census, there were 52,778 people. The population was counted at 48,174 in the 2010 census. The racial makeup of the city in 2010 was 83.90% White, 1.0% African American, 1.0% Native American, 3.30% Asian, 0.5% Pacific Islander, 8.0% from other races, and 2.3% from two or more races. Hispanic or Latino of any race were 13.9% of the population.

Age
As of the 2000 Census there were 13,902 households counted in Logan, out of which 33.4% had children under the age of 18 living with them, 55.1% were married couples living together, 7.7% had a female householder with no husband present, and 34.0% were non-families. 17.9% of all households were made up of individuals, and 5.7% had someone living alone who was 65 years of age or older. The average household size was 2.92 and the average family size was 3.20.

In the city, the population was spread out, with
23.4% under the age of 18
34.3% from 18 to 24
25.5% from 25 to 44
9.7% from 45 to 64
7.1% who were 65 years of age or older.

The median age was 24 years. For every 100 females, there were 92.1 males. For every 100 females age 18 and over, there were 89.5 males.

Income
As of the 2000 Census the median income for a household in the city was $30,778, and the median income for a family was $33,784. Males had a median income of $27,304 versus $19,687 for females. The per capita income for the city was $13,765. About 12.6% of families and 22.7% of the population were below the poverty line, including 15.6% of those under age 18 and 6.4% of those age 65 or over.

Government
Alvin Crockett was the city's first mayor. Mayor Craig Petersen took office in 2014 for a four-year term, beating the incumbent mayor, who was running for a third term. Randy Watts took office on January 3, 2006, and was re-elected to another four-year term beginning in 2010. Logan City Council Members include Ernesto Lopez, Amy Z. Anderson, Tom Jensen, Jeannie F. Simmonds and Mark A. Anderson. In November 2017, Holly H. Daines was elected mayor of Logan. Logan does not use districts for voting and election purposes, as the mayor and council members are elected at large.

Education

According to the U.S. Census Bureau, 12.3% of adults 25 years and older have graduate or professional degrees, 22.2% have bachelor's degrees, 8.4% have associate degrees, and 27.7% have some college but no degree. This may be an influence of the high percentage of Utah State University faculty and staff residing in the city.

Average ACT scores in the Logan School District in 2005 were 21.5 for English, 21.3 for math, 22.7 for reading, 22.1 for science and 22 composite score. Average ACT scores in the Cache County School District, which surrounds Logan, in 2005 were 20.9 in English, 20.8 in math, 22.5 in reading, 21.5 in science and 21.5 composite score. 250 Logan High students took the ACT in 2005 and 593 Mountain Crest/Sky View/Cache High students (in Cache County School District) took the test in 2005.

Approximately $4,146 is spent per pupil in the Logan School District. In October 2005, there were 2,600 kindergarten through fifth-grade students, 1,252 sixth- through eighth-grade students and 1,702 high school students. Those numbers report about a 100-student decrease from the previous year. Drop-out rate was 2.3%. 11% of students speak English as a second language.

During the 2004–2005 school year there were 321 professional teachers, resulting in a pupil/teacher ratio of 25.9. The average contract salary for teachers was $38,639.

There are six elementary schools (K–5), one middle school, (6–8), and one high school, Logan High School (9–12), with two campuses, in Logan. There is also a charter high school in Logan and one alternative high school in Logan for the Cache County School District. The Cache District has four regular high schools outside Logan in other cities.

Edith Bowen Laboratory School, on the campus of Utah State University, provides an alternative educational opportunity for children.

Thomas Edison Charter School, which has campuses in North Logan and Nibley, is a public school for grades K-8 offering an academic stimulated curriculum. There are also a number of small private schools in Logan.

Logan River Academy is an adolescent residential treatment center that operates in the southern end of Logan.

InTech Collegiate High School is a public charter school at the Innovation Campus of Utah State University, just outside Logan. It offers an early college program and a STEM (science, technology, engineering, and math)-focused curriculum for grades 9–12.

Bridgerland Technical College provides classes in business, dental technology, design and construction, fashion and hospitality, health science, information technology, manufacturing, nutrition and food, public safety, and transportation.

As the home to Utah State University, a Land-Grant University classified by Carnegie Foundation as a Doctoral/Research University Extensive offers bachelor's degrees, master's degrees, and doctoral degrees in several fields.

Logan was home to the Brigham Young College, a college run by the Church of Jesus Christ of Latter-day Saints (LDS Church) from 1878 to 1926. Its library and its papers were given to the Utah State University when it ceased operating.

Arts and culture

Logan is home to the Utah Festival Opera, which hosts a number of performances through the year. The Ellen Eccles Theatre shows concerts, community theater, ballet, and classic movies, and it also hosts national touring companies. Cache Valley Center for the Arts offers a variety of community arts classes and hosts numerous "Gallery Walk" events throughout the year in which participating businesses in historic downtown Logan feature different art, music, and food. The Summerfest Arts Faire, held annually at the Logan Tabernacle grounds on Father's Day Weekend, celebrates the arts through a fine art/fine craft festival with music, food and children's activities.

Utah State University hosts many artistic and cultural events, including traveling art galleries, symphony performances, plays and public lectures.

Logan Library, founded in 1916, makes more than 200,000 items available for residents to borrow and also hosts hundreds of events each year for all ages.

Logan hosts a vendor owned farmers' market every Saturday from May through October. Named one of America's best farmers' markets in 2009, the "Cache Valley Gardeners' Market" was at Merlin Olsen Park, and is now in front of City Hall. Over twenty years old, the market is known as a gathering place for the sale of fresh, local produce, coffee, artisan breads, eggs, handcrafted gift items, art, children's activities and also for weekly concerts.

Parks and recreation

Logan's Parks and Recreation department runs the Logan River Golf Course, the Logan/Cache County Fairgrounds, and the Logan Aquatic Center.

Logan Canyon has numerous hiking and camping areas, and its scenic First, Second, and Third Dams provide popular gathering spots for picnics and fishing. Logan Canyon also offers rock-climbing, snowmobiling, hunting and skiing. Beaver Mountain is a popular ski resort located in Logan Canyon.

Zootah at Willow Park is a small zoo in Logan's Willow Park, with a small collection of wild animals including monkeys, coyotes, bobcats, bald eagles, and land birds and ducks.

Logan is the home of two full-length golf courses, the Logan River Golf Course and the Logan Golf and Country Club. Other golf courses are also found around the Cache Valley Area.

There are numerous events at the Logan/Cache County Fairgrounds including fairs, rodeos, and demolition derbies. Nearby, the city of Logan runs an aquatic center and a skate park. During the winter season, the city operates an outdoor ice skating rink at Merlin Olsen Park (Central Park).

Media
Logan is home to The Herald Journal, a daily newspaper, and the Cache Valley Daily, a news site operated by KVNU 610 AM / 102.1 FM and the Cache Valley Media Group. Both news outlets cover the Logan and Cache Valley area. Many Logan residents also subscribe to the Salt Lake City-based Salt Lake Tribune and Deseret News, both of which cover Cache Valley happenings to some degree.

Northern Utah Media Group and KUTA-TV 8 own and operate multiple news television stations and the largest information website chain within the area. KUTA-TV 8 has coverage on digital 8.1, USU cable channel 61, and Comcast channel 118. Northern Utah Media Group owns and operates over 150 websites covering the Cache Valley and Northern Utah area. Each website contains many years' worth of video archives of local miscellaneous community events, government meetings, USU athletics, high school sports events, performances and news broadcasts.

The Valley Channel is a local television station which provides community-oriented programs, news talk shows, and coverage of local high school sporting events and Utah State University hockey. For primary television network affiliates, Logan is considered part of the Salt Lake City media market.

Utah Public Radio (UPR) is a National Public Radio affiliate on the Logan campus of Utah State University and a part of the College of Humanities and Social Sciences. It broadcasts in Logan at 89.5 FM and 91.5 FM.

Utah State University hosts a freelance college radio station called Aggie Radio. As of 2016 they are live over 92.3 FM. The station sponsors one large music festival each year called Logan City Limits. They also host a campus centered concert series The Big Agg Show. Their Motto is "Alternative radio for an alternative audience."

The Cache Valley Media Group includes several radio stations, such as KVNU 610 AM / 102.1 FM with local news and talk programs, Utah State Aggies and Logan High School sports, 92.9 FM KBLQ with soft rock, 94.5 FM KVFX with Top 40, 95.9 FM KLZX with classic rock, 96.7 FM KKEX with country, 103.9 KGNT with oldies, and 1390 AM / 103.3 FM KLGN.

The Utah Statesman, a student-run newspaper based on the Utah State Campus covers the majority of campus news as well as the connections between USU and the community.

Economy
Logan has a wide diversity of economic sectors with a focus on education, manufacturing and processing, medical services, agriculture, and retail businesses. The city's largest employer is Utah State University, with other major employers including Icon Health & Fitness, Cache County School District, Logan Regional Hospital, Thermo Fisher Scientific, Gossner Foods, and Schreiber Foods.

Headquartered in Logan 

 Utah State University – doctoral land-grant university
 Space Dynamics Laboratory - USU owned research corporation
CVB INC d/b/a Malouf - manufacturer of bedding and furniture products
 ICON Health & Fitness – manufacturer of fitness equipment 
 S&S Worldwide – manufacturer of amusement park rides
 Gossner Foods – dairy product manufacturer
 Utah Festival Opera – founded and headquartered in Logan
 Ifrogz - manufacturer of cases for Apple products
 Altra Zero Drop Footwear - running footwear
 Camp Chef - manufacturer of outdoor cooking equipment
 Cache Valley Bank - regional bancorporation
 Electric Power Systems (EP Systems) - manufacturer of electric propulsion systems for transportation markets
 Scytek Laboratories Inc – manufacture of diagnostic reagents Special Stains, Antibodies, Hematology, Microbiology, Hematoxlyn

Other
 Cytiva –bioprocessing products and services
 RR Donnelley – mass printing and manufacturing
 PoliticIt - political website
 Life Technologies - technology for biotech
Logan River Academy - a residential treatment center for teens
Crumbl Cookies - a cookie company that was started from students attending Utah State.

Transportation

In 2009, the Logan metropolitan statistical area (MSA) ranked as the eighth highest in the United States for percentage of commuters who biked to work (3.3 percent).

Highways
U.S. Highways US-89 and US-91 enter Logan from the southwest as a combined highway, and then separate in downtown Logan. US-91 goes north into Idaho, and US-89 goes east into Logan Canyon, and then to Bear Lake. The Logan Utah–Idaho Metropolitan Statistical Area is one of the few metropolitan statistical areas in Utah not connected via an interstate highway (Interstate 15), and one of the few its size not connected to any interstate anywhere.

Transit and taxi
Logan is served by a local sales-tax-funded zero-fare bus system called the Cache Valley Transit District (CVTD), which incorporated the Logan Transit District (LTD) in 2007. The LTD system began in 1992 with six routes in Logan. Service outside of Logan began with the formation of CVTD in 2001. The system has 16 routes that serve Logan and the adjacent cities of North Logan and River Heights. These include a northern route that reaches north to Richmond, and a southern route that serves the southern suburbs and Hyrum. There is also a five-time daily connection to Lewiston and Preston, Idaho. Despite a shorter distance to, and a larger resident population, there remains no connection with Brigham City within the CVTD; some have speculated this is due to pressure from the For-Profit shuttle, Salt Lake Express, operating within Cache Valley.

There are also two taxi companies, Cache Cab LLC and Logan Taxi.

Air travel
There is a public general aviation airport at Logan, the Logan-Cache Airport (with IATA code LGU), but has no scheduled airline services. However, Logan is within ready driving distance or shuttle ride of Salt Lake City International Airport. The Logan-Cache Airport also offers flight instruction and classes to USU students, along with some scheduled services of private carriers or arrangements.

Special events
Logan hosts the annual "Cache Valley Cruise-In", Utah's largest automotive event, with a three-day exhibit of special cars and vehicles, concerts, and other activities. Events conclude with a car parade on Main Street.

Logan is also home to the annual "Small Satellite Conference", a week long conference attended by industry and academia from around the world, hosted by the American Institute of Aeronautics and Astronautics and Utah State University.

Each June, Logan showcases local artwork, food, and performers at its annual "Summerfest Arts Faire" on the lawn of the historic Logan Tabernacle.

In October 2016 the city held its first annual LGBTQA Pride festival.

In Autumn season, Smile Events Productions and Beaver Mountain host a large music festival dubbed the "Beaver Mountain Music Festival." This is an outdoor concert with many activities and stages.

Recognition
 CNN Money magazine ranked Logan third on its list of Best Places to Retire Young in 2007.
 In 2006, Forbes listed Logan 10th on its list of Best Small Places For Business & Careers.
 The Monday Report listed Logan as the most walkable community in Utah in a 2009 study.
 In 2010, The Daily Beast ranked Logan the #1 city in America to be a kid on Christmas.
 In 2019, Logan was listed by KSL (radio) as the best college town in Utah for 2019–2020 school year.

Notable people

 Jawahir Ahmed, model and beauty pageant winner
 Neil L. Andersen, LDS Church apostle born in Logan
 Rocky Anderson, mayor of Salt Lake City 2000–2008
 Michael Ballam, opera singer, founder of Utah Festival Opera Company
 Elaine Bradley, member of Neon Trees rock band
 Hugh B. Brown military officer, politician, LDS Church leader
 Reed Budge, Idaho legislator
 Charles Bullen, politician
 Shay Carl, internet celebrity
 Ron Carlson, novelist and short story writer
 Quentin L. Cook, LDS Church apostle
 Chris Cooley, Washington Redskins football player
 Kevin Curtis, NFL football player
 Marriner Eccles, former chairman of the Federal Reserve Bank
 Luke Falk, football player for Washington State University, New York Jets
 Rulon Gardner, 2000 Olympic gold medalist (Greco-Roman wrestling)
 Hal Garner, football player for the Buffalo Bills
 John Gilbert, silent film star
 Morris R. Jeppson, weapons test officer, Enola Gay
 Robert M. Kimmitt, former Deputy Secretary of the Treasury, United States Ambassador to Germany
 Russell Maughan, pioneer aviator, first person to fly across America in a single day
 Joseph M. Newman, film director
 Chase Nielsen, member of Doolittle Raid
 Merlin Olsen, football player for Los Angeles Rams, actor and TV personality
 L. Tom Perry, LDS Church apostle
 Casey Robinson, screenwriter and film producer
 Lenore Romney, former First Lady of Michigan, mother of Mitt Romney
 May Swenson, poet
 Jean Sullivan, actress
 Kip Thorne, astronomer, physicist, 2017 Nobel laureate for the observation of gravitational waves
 John W. Welch, law and religion scholar
 Larry Winborg, illustrator and gallery owner
 Evelyn Wood, speed-reading entrepreneur

Twin towns – sister cities
Logan is twinned with:

See also
 List of cities and towns in Utah
 Utah State University
 Logan Canyon

References

External links

 
 Cache Valley Visitors Bureau
 Cache Chamber of Commerce

 
Cities in Utah
County seats in Utah
Cities in Cache County, Utah
Populated places established in 1859
Logan metropolitan area
1859 establishments in Utah Territory